Kim Yong-ha was a North Korean football manager.

He was appointed as the Head coach of the Cuba national football team for the 1970 Central American and Caribbean Games and the 1971 Pan American Games tournament.

Kim Yong-ha was also the trainer of the Cuba national team during their tour of Vietnam in 1970.

Achievements 

Central American and Caribbean Games:  Gold (1970)
Pan American Games: Bronze (1971)

References 

Possibly living people
North Korean football managers
North Korean expatriate football managers
20th-century North Korean people
Place of birth missing
Year of birth missing
North Korean expatriate sportspeople in Cuba
Expatriate football managers in Cuba
Cuba national football team managers